Opisthoteuthis albatrossi (common name in ) is a cirrate octopus originally found off Kinkasan in Japan. This species was described from only four specimens. It is similar to Opisthoteuthis californiana; the two may be the same species. It is also similar to Opisthoteuthis japonica.

O. albatrossi lives in the North Pacific, from Japanese waters to the Sea of Okhotsk.

Description
Each arm has more than 80 suckers, and males have some very enlarged suckers, typical to opisthoteuthids. Like other cirrate octopuses, it has a thick, fleshy web connecting its arms; a small internal shell to support its body; and cirri on its arms.

References

External links
Drawings of the octopus and its body parts 

Octopuses
Cephalopods of Oceania
Molluscs of the Pacific Ocean
Marine molluscs of Asia
Molluscs of Japan
Molluscs described in 1920